Frank Brady may refer to:

Frank Brady (writer) (born 1934), American writer
Frank Brady Sr. (born 1902), Irish footballer  
Frank Brady Jr. (died 2009), his great-nephew, Irish footballer

See also
Francis Brady (disambiguation)
Brady (surname)